Robert "Bob" Bozada is a former American soccer player who played professionally in the North American Soccer League and the Major Indoor Soccer League.

Player
Bozada attended St. Thomas Aquinas High School in Florissant, MO. There, in 1975, he helped lead the Falcons to their first state soccer championship. After graduating from Aquinas in 1977, Bozada moved on to Southern Illinois University Edwardsville, playing on the men's soccer team from 1977 to 1979.  In 1979, Bozada led the Cougars to win the NCAA Men's Division I Soccer Championship, a 3–2 victory over the Clemson Tigers.  In 1980, the Minnesota Kicks selected Bozada in the second round of the North American Soccer League draft.  He played no games during the 1980 outdoor season, and eleven during the 1980-1981 NASL indoor season.  The Kicks then traded him to the St. Louis Steamers of the Major Indoor Soccer League.  After two seasons with the Steamers, he finished his career with two seasons with the Kansas City Comets.  He later played for the Kalamazoo Kangaroos of the American Indoor Soccer Association.

Coach
In 1989, Bozada became the first head coach of the University of Missouri–Kansas City men's soccer team.  He compiled a 49-29-1 record over six seasons. Bozada also worked for the Kansas City Wizards from 2007 to 2011.

Family
Bozada has two sons, Robert, born in 1985 and Kevin in 1988. Both were accomplished athletes growing up with Kevin taking 1st team all-state honors in both soccer and lacrosse in high school and later playing on the University of Oregon Men's Lacrosse team in 2007–2009. Today, Kevin is the Clubhouse Manager at the Augusta National Golf Club, home of the Masters Tournament.

References

External links
 NASL/MISL stats

1959 births
Living people
Soccer players from St. Louis
American Indoor Soccer Association players
American soccer coaches
American soccer players
Houston Dynamos players
Kalamazoo Kangaroos players
Kansas City Comets (original MISL) players
Minnesota Kicks players
Major Indoor Soccer League (1978–1992) players
North American Soccer League (1968–1984) indoor players
North American Soccer League (1968–1984) players
SIU Edwardsville Cougars men's soccer players
St. Louis Steamers (original MISL) players
United Soccer League (1984–85) players
Association football utility players
Kansas City Roos men's soccer coaches